The Western Australian Government Railways Commission was formed on 18 December 2000 to take over the non-freight operations of Westrail, following the freight operations being sold to Australian Western Railroad. It was the owner of the non-metropolitan rail network, that was leased to Australian Western Railroad, and responsible for regional passenger services, The Australind, AvonLink and The Prospector as well as regional coach services.

It ceased on 30 June 2003 with its functions transferred to the Public Transport Authority.

References

Defunct government agencies of Western Australia
Public transport in Western Australia
Railway companies established in 2000
Railway companies disestablished in 2003
Rail transport in Western Australia
Australian companies established in 2000
Australian companies disestablished in 2003